The Concorde Tower is a 45-floor tower in the Jumeirah Lake Towers Free Zone in Dubai, United Arab Emirates.  The residential tower, which is estimated to cost US$120 million to construct, has a total structural height of 190 m (623 ft).  The developer said the building was to be completed in December 2007. Due to the force majeure situations, building got completed in February 2009, and ready for use on April 2009.

See also 
 List of tallest buildings in Dubai

References

External links
Concorde Tower on 32Group's website

Residential buildings completed in 2009
Residential skyscrapers in Dubai
2009 establishments in the United Arab Emirates